Thomas Zwiefelhofer (born December 10, 1969) is a politician from Liechtenstein who served as the Deputy Prime Minister of Liechtenstein and Minister of Home Affairs, Justice and Economic Affairs.

Zwiefelhofer is a Doctor of law and has graduated in architecture. He is married, has three children and lives with his family in Vaduz.

Career

Thomas Zwiefelhofer got his Matura, the general qualification for university entrance, in 1989 at the Liechtenstein secondary school in Vaduz. Subsequently he started studying architecture at the ETH Zurich Faculty of Architecture, where he graduated in 1996 as a certified architect. Afterwards he worked as an architect and project leader for two years at ZRH Architekten AG in Zollikon.

From 1998 to 2000, Zwiefelhofer attended the University of St. Gallen, where he studied law. From then, until he entered politics in 2013, Zwiefelhofer practiced law at the general trust company in Vaduz where he also was a member of the management board. In 2002 he successfully completed a course in trusts at the Liechtenstein University of applied sciences. 2007, Zwiefelhofer went back to the University of St. Gallen to get his Ph.D. in law. From 2009 to 2010, he also reached a Certificate of Advanced Studies in national and international tax law at the University of Liechtenstein.

At the 2013 parliamentary election, Zwiefelhofer was the Patriotic Union’s candidate for Prime Minister. The Patriotic Union came in second to the Progressive Citizens' Party, however, the two formed a grand coalition, and as a result, Zwiefelhofer became the Deputy Prime Minister in the Government of the Principality of Liechtenstein. Additionally he currently serves as Minister of Home Affairs, Justice and Economic Affairs.

In parallel, he remains the Honorary consul of Republic of Poland in Liechtenstein.

Honours 
  : Commander's cross with star of the Order of Merit of the Principality of Liechtenstein (08/06/2017).

References

External links
Thomas Zwiefelhofer at the official website of the government of Liechtenstein.

Patriotic Union (Liechtenstein) politicians
1969 births
Living people
ETH Zurich alumni
University of St. Gallen alumni
Deputy Prime Ministers of Liechtenstein
Economy ministers of Liechtenstein
Interior ministers of Liechtenstein
Justice ministers of Liechtenstein